Thérèse Raquin is a 1868 novel and a 1873 play by  Émile Zola.

Thérèse Raquin may also refer to:
 Thérèse Raquin (1928 film), a film based on the novel by Zola
 Thérèse Raquin (1953 film), a film based on the Zola novel
 Thérèse Raquin (opera), a 2-act 2001 U.S. opera by Tobias Picker and Gene Scheer, based on the Zola novel